Ardmulchan Fort  is a ringfort (rath) and National Monument located in County Meath, Ireland.

Location
Ardmulchan ringfort is located on the right bank of the River Boyne near to Taaffe's Lock, 3.5 km (2 mi) west of Yellow Furze. It should not be confused with another ringfort, also located in Ardmulchan townland, near Broadboyne Bridge, which is not a National Monument.

Description

The ringfort is a flat-topped oval mound of earth (top dimensions  N-S x  E-W). The rath is defined by a scarp around the base.

References

Archaeological sites in County Meath
National Monuments in County Meath